Robinsons is an English fruit drink brand owned by Britvic. Robinsons has a royal warrant from the monarch and was an independent company until 1995 when it was acquired by Britvic. The Robinsons range includes Fruit Shoot, Fruit Squash, No Added Sugar Fruit Squash, Fruit & Barley, Barley water, Select and Squash'd; the range formerly also included Fruit Spring. For the Diamond Jubilee of Elizabeth II, Strawberry and Cream was added to the range.

Robinsons sales for 2009 (across all its ranges) totalled £307 million in 2009. Robinson's has been the official supplier of drinks to Wimbledon tennis tournament, its barley water being conspicuous by its presence, and sponsored the championship fortnight from 1935 to 2022.

Products

Fruit Shoot
Robinsons Fruit Shoot is a brand of fruit drink designed to appeal to children. The drinks are promoted as a supposedly healthier alternative to fizzy drinks, and are offered as one of the drink options for McDonald's Happy Meals and KFC 'Kids Meals'; this has been cited in representations to the UK Parliament on Britvic's healthier eating initiatives. Fruit Shoots were described by Britvic as a "high juice, no added sugar drink" (the juice content is only 8%).

The regular Fruit Shoot range with the green top is a full sugar product and does not contain aspartame (the No Added Sugar version with the grey top does). Although the grey top range has no added sugar, it contains Potassium Sorbate (Preservative) and Sodium Citrate, plus natural colourings and malic acid. It is sold in a sports-style bottle, and since its launch in 2000 has become the best-selling children's ready-to-drink still beverage in the UK, beating better-established brands such as Ribena. In 2012, Britvic recalled packs featuring the 'spill proof Magicap' design due to concerns over packaging safety.

Fruit Creations
In January 2018, Robinsons launched their Fruit Creations range, specifically targeting adults.

References

External links
 

British Royal Warrant holders
British soft drink brands
Juice brands